Purpuricenus humeralis is a species of beetle in the family Cerambycidae. It was described by Fabricus in 1798.

References

Trachyderini
Beetles described in 1798